Liulin is a town in Baota District, Yan'an, Shaanxi province, China. Liulin has a population of 46,991 according to the 2010 Chinese Census.

History 
In 1972, the Liulin People's Commune was established. In 1984, the Liulin People's Commune was replaced by Liulin Township. Liulin was upgraded to a town in 1998, which it remains today.

Administrative divisions 
Liulin administers 5 residential communities and 22 administrative villages.

Residential communities 
Liulin's 5 residential communities are as follows:

 Liulin Community
 Yangou Community
 Nancheng Community
 Hutouyuan Community
 Jinyue Community

Administrative villages 
Liulin's 22 administrative villages are as follows:

 Liulin Village
 Erzhuangke Village
 Zhaozhuang Village
 Wuzaoyuan Village
 Mata Village
 Nanzhuanghe Village
 Shaoyuanliang Village
 Hutoumao Village
 Wangjiagou Village
 Shanlangcha Village
 Gaopo Village
 Ershilipu Village
 Goumen Village
 Huaishuwa Village
 Hezhuang Village
 Sanshilipu Village
 Rentai Village
 Niuzhuang Village
 Yuanzhuang Village
 Sishilipu Village
 Mazhuang Village
 Kongjiagou Village

Demographics 
According to the 2010 Chinese Census, Liulin had a population of 46,991. This is an increase from the 24,429 recorded in the 2000 Chinese Census, and a 1996 estimate putting Liulin's population at approximately 12,000.

Transportation 
Yan'an Nanniwan Airport, which opened on October 1, 2018, to replace Yan'an Ershilipu Airport, is located in Liulin. As of late 2018, Yan'an Nanniwan has direct flights to Beijing, Xi'an, Chongqing, Guangzhou, Qingdao, Hangzhou, Nanjing, Shenzhen, Haikou, and Tianjin. National Highway 210 runs through Liulin.

See also
List of township-level divisions of Shaanxi

References

Baota District
Township-level divisions of Shaanxi
Towns in China